Pak Sha Wan, or Lyee Mun Bay, was a bay to the north of Chai Wan on Hong Kong Island, with Lei Yue Mun, Tseung Kwan O and Tathong Channel opposite. It was reclaimed to construct Heng Fa Chuen, one of the largest private housing estates on Hong Kong Island, MTR Heng Fa Chuen station and Chai Wan Depot.

Others 
Heng Fa Chuen
Heng Fa Chuen station

References

Bays of Hong Kong
Chai Wan
Heng Fa Chuen